"You've Got a Lover" is a song written by Shake Russell and released on his first album (with Dana Cooper) in 1978, Songs On The Radio. It was later covered by American country music artist Ricky Skaggs on his album Highways & Heartaches, released in July 1982.  It was the fourth single, released in July 1983, from this album and the song reached #2 on the Billboard Hot Country Singles chart and #1 on the RPM Country Tracks chart in Canada.

Chart performance

References

1983 singles
1982 songs
Ricky Skaggs songs
Song recordings produced by Ricky Skaggs
Epic Records singles